A420 may refer to :

 A420 road (England)
 Bass Highway (Victoria), a highway in Australia